Rômulo Silva Santos (born 1 November 1992) is a Brazilian footballer who plays as a forward for SV Stockerau.

Club career

FK Senica
Rômulo made his Fortuna Liga debut for Senica against AS Trenčín on 23 July 2017.

References

External links
 FK Senica official club profile
 
 Futbalnet profile
 Rômulo at ZeroZero

1992 births
Living people
People from Marabá
Brazilian footballers
Brazilian expatriate footballers
Association football forwards
Leixões S.C. players
F.C. Vizela players
G.D. Tourizense players
Clube Esportivo Bento Gonçalves players
Maringá Futebol Clube players
São José Esporte Clube players
Itumbiara Esporte Clube players
Clube Atlético Bragantino players
FK Bodva Moldava nad Bodvou players
Operário Futebol Clube (MS) players
FK Haniska players
Partizán Bardejov players
FK Senica players
Senglea Athletic F.C. players
Qormi F.C. players
FK Slavoj Trebišov players
SV Stockerau players
Slovak Super Liga players
2. Liga (Slovakia) players
Maltese Premier League players
Brazilian expatriate sportspeople in Portugal
Brazilian expatriate sportspeople in Slovakia
Brazilian expatriate sportspeople in Malta
Expatriate footballers in Portugal
Expatriate footballers in Slovakia
Expatriate footballers in Malta
Sportspeople from Pará